Wakde Airfield is a World War II airfield located on Wakde Island, off the northern coast of New Guinea in Papua, Indonesia. The airfield was abandoned after the war and today is almost totally returned to its natural state.

History
The airfield was constructed by the Japanese and was first noted by the Americans in February 1943. By June 1943, a single coral–surfaced 5,400' x 390' runway, with dispersal areas off the northern side was identified, and a barracks area on the south side was visible. By September, the Japanese had expanded the base further with a radio station and quarters for 1,000 personnel.

Wadke Airfield was seized by the United States Army on 15 May 1944. Construction work was begun to repair the airstrip once the battle was over on 18 May. The airfield was repaired and put into use by the Fifth Air Force as a forward operations base. From Wakde, the first American reconnaissance mission of the Philippines since the fall of Corregidor in 1942 was undertaken, over Mindanao.

Allied units stationed at Wakde Airfield
 XIII Bomber Command (3 September–17 October 1944)
 5th Bombardment Group (17 August–22 September 1944)
 Headquarters, 394th Bomb Squadron, B-24 Liberator
 307th Bombardment Group (24 August–18 October 1944)
 Headquarters, 370th, 371st, 372d, 424th Bomb Squadrons , B-24 Liberator

 348th Fighter Group (22 May–26 August 1944)
 Headquarters, 340th, 341st Fighter Squadrons, P-47 Thunderbolt
 100th Service Squadron
 13th Troop Carrier Squadron (403d Troop Carrier Group), (4–19 October 1944), C-47 Skytrain
 63d Troop Carrier Squadron (403d Troop Carrier Group), (4–29 October 1944), C-47 Skytrain
 64th Troop Carrier Squadron (403d Troop Carrier Group), (2–29 October 1944), C-47 Skytrain

See also

Naval Base Hollandia
 USAAF in the Southwest Pacific

References

Citations

Bibliography 

Airports in Papua (province)
Airfields of the United States Army Air Forces in the South West Pacific theatre of World War II
Defunct airports in Indonesia
World War II sites in Indonesia